Jeremiah "Joe" Jeannette (also Jennette) (August 26, 1879 – July 2, 1958) was an American boxer, considered one of the best heavyweight boxers of the early 20th century.  Because he was African-American, he was not given a shot at the world heavyweight title, though he did win the World Colored Heavyweight Championship on two occasions.

Early life and career
Jeannette was born on August 26, 1879, in West Hoboken, New Jersey, which is now part of Union City, to Mena and Benjamin F. Jeanette, who worked for a local blacksmith. He began work as his father's apprentice, and then as a coal truck driver for Jaels and Bellis. In 1904, at the age of 25, he began his boxing career on a dare, fighting against Arthur Dickinson in Jersey City. At  and weighing , Jeanette was relatively short and stocky, with his initial knowledge of fighting stemming from youthful street brawls.

Professional career

Within two years, Jeanette was considered one of the best black heavyweights in the United States. Jeanette mimicked the style of Sam Langford, whom he fought 15 times (some sources say 14), developing defensive techniques that were elusive and effective. Opponents considered Jeanette, whose style reflected the "inside punching" style of the times, a dangerous inside boxer whom few wished to fight. Because of the racial barrier, black boxers only had a small number of prospective opponents from which to choose, and often ended up matched against the same fighters over and over.

Jeanette fought the future heavyweight champion Jack Johnson seven times in his first two years as a pro, and a total of ten times. According to the Ken Burns documentary Unforgivable Blackness, Jeanette lost twice, won one fight on a foul after two rounds, had two draws, and five "No Decisions" in his fights against Johnson. Johnson called Jeannette "the toughest man I ever fought."

After Johnson became the first African-American Heavyweight Champion of the World on December 26, 1908, he never again fought Jeanette, despite numerous challenges.  Johnson's refusal to fight African-Americans offended the African-American community. Jeanette criticized Johnson, saying, "Jack forgot about his old friends after he became champion and drew the color line against his own people."

Jeanette was never allowed to fight for the heavyweight championship during his 15-year career, despite having a stellar record against opponents of all races.

Joe's most memorable fight occurred on April 17, 1909 in a return bout with Sam McVey in Paris, France that lasted three-and-a-half-hours, and 49 rounds, the longest boxing match of the 20th century, and one of the greatest marathons in boxing history. Although McVey began the fight strong and looked like a sure winner, knocking down the usually sturdy Jeannette 27 times, and almost knocking him out in the 16th round with a right uppercut to Jeanette's jaw, he weakened greatly by the 19th round. Jeanette took control, knocking down McVey, a boxer (who had only been stopped once in his career, by Johnson), 19 times. After the 49th round, McVey could not rise from his stool at the call of time and Jeannette was declared winner on a technical knockout. This won him the "World Colored Heavyweight Championship," as Jack Johnson had defeated Tommy Burns for his heavyweight title the previous December.

Jeanette retired in 1919 at the age of 40. Of his 166 documented pro fights (he believed it was closer to 400), in a career spanning 1904-1922, Jeanette had 106 wins, 68 of which were by knockout, with 20 losses. Only two of his losses were by knockout, once early in his career and once late in his career. He is rated alongside the very best boxers of his era, including Johnson, Langford, and McVey.

He starred in the 1921 film Square Joe.

Personal life
Jeanette met his wife, Adelaide, at a dance in Hoboken. They had two children, a son, Joe Jr., and a daughter, Agnes.

Post-boxing career and legacy

Unlike many boxers, Jeanette was not a spendthrift and invested his money and time wisely. He spent most of his career fighting in and around the Eastern Seaboard, with only brief tours of Europe. After his career, he became a referee and a trainer of young boxers. He owned a boxing gym on 27th Street and Summit Avenue in Union City, New Jersey, where he was a fixture on the boxing scene for many years, training hundreds of boxers, including Heavyweight Champion James J. Braddock.

Jeanette, who was fond of automobiles, eventually converted his boxing gym into a garage, out of which he operated a fleet of rental limousines, and then a taxi company named Adelaide, after his wife, which was located at 522 Clinton Avenue, now New York Avenue.

Jeanette died in 1958. He is buried in Fairview, New Jersey.

He was inducted into the International Boxing Hall of Fame in 1997.

A street in Union City, located between Summit Avenue and Kennedy Boulevard, was named Jeanette Street in his honor.

A historical marker was subsequently dedicated at the corner of Summit Avenue and 27th Street, where Jeanette's former residence and gym once stood. It was the first historical marker erected by the city, and was installed on April 17, 2009, the 100th anniversary of Jeannette’s 49th-round knockout of Sam McVea.

Professional boxing record
All information in this section is derived from BoxRec, unless otherwise noted.

Official record

All newspaper decisions are officially regarded as "no decision" bouts and are not counted in the win/loss/draw column.

Unofficial record

Record with the inclusion of newspaper decisions in the win/loss/draw column.

References

1879 births
1958 deaths
Sportspeople from Union City, New Jersey
Boxers from New Jersey
Heavyweight boxers
African-American boxers
World colored heavyweight boxing champions
American male boxers
People from Union City, New Jersey
20th-century African-American people